Stepney Green cavern is an underground junction which contains the junction where Crossrail divides into two branches: one to Shenfield and one to Abbey Wood. It is located below Stepney Green Park. At the time of its completion in 2017, Stepney Green cavern was claimed to have been one of the largest mined caverns in Europe.

Construction activity commenced during March 2010, almost two years after the programme's authorisation. The cavern was built using spray concrete lining techniques, and involved the use of multiple tunnel boring machines (TBMs). During 2013, excavation work was largely completed, while both of the TBMs were dismantled during the following year. During October 2017, it was announced that all major structural work associated with Stepney Green cavern had been completed.

History
The origins of Stepney Green cavern are strongly associated with the Crossrail programme. Construction of the railway begun shortly after the Crossrail Act 2008 received royal assent during July 2008. In addition to forming one element of the central underground section of the new railway, Stepney Green accommodated a critical junction, requiring care in its design.

The engineering of Stepney Green cavern involved overcoming several challenges, as it was one of the largest excavated caverns to be constructed in Europe. Due to the presence of highly permeable water-bearing sand that posed a hazard during the shotcrete application, depressurisation measures were employed. The boring process was largely performed via multiple TBMs.

Various measures were taken to support the construction effort. To supply the large quantities of concrete needed, a purpose-built batching plant was constructed to manufacture it on site. A variety of sensors were installed in the vicinity of the cavern to closely monitor any instances of ground movement, vigorous measuring of the applied concrete's strength was also practiced. Furthermore, a specialised cutting tool was used to remove the temporary supports, which generated far less noise than conventional impact hammers. Primary access to the site was via a rectangular access shaft that is located across the twin running tunnels just to the west of the junctions; this space also accommodates various utility spaces, including a ventilation facility, as well as providing an emergency access point.

During March 2010, shortly after being awarded the contract to construct the section, the contractor took possession of the site; initial activity centred around the excavation of the first large access and operations shaft. During May 2013, the eastbound section of the cavern was completed ahead of schedule; completion of the westbound section was achieved in August 2013. The first breakthrough of a TBM into the cavern was achieved during the latter half of 2013.

During June 2014, it was announced that one of the TBMs had finished its boring activity at Stepney Green; the occasion also marked the structural completion of all tunnels of the line's north east spur. Upon arriving at Stepney Green, the TBMs were disassembled and removed in pieces, before being reassembled elsewhere to work on additional Crossrail elements. During October 2017, Crossrail announced the completion of all work associated with Stepney Green cavern, which was stated to be a major milestone of the overall scheme.

References

External links
 Image of Stepney Green cavern via gettyimages.co.uk
 Crossrail: tunnelling on an epic scale via ingenia.org.uk

Crossrail
Railway tunnels in England
Rail junctions in Great Britain
Tunnels in London